Equality Hawaii was a statewide political advocacy organization in Hawaii that advocated for lesbian, gay, bisexual, and transgender (LGBT) rights, including same-sex marriage.

History 
Equality Hawaii was founded as Family Equality Coalition on November 16, 2007, as a 501(c)(4) nonprofit corporation. It was founded based on community and expert input at the organization's first meeting in September 2007 after a civil unions bill was attempted in February 2007. The organization made an early commitment to advocating for same-sex marriage in Hawaii. The first general membership meeting was held in partnership with UNITE HERE Local 5 and featured Cleve Jones. In 2010, the board elected to change its name to Equality Hawaii to reflect its scope expanding beyond just same-sex marriage.

Originally named Family Equality Foundation, Equality Hawaii Foundation (EHF) was founded on October 27, 2009 as a 501(c)(3) nonprofit corporation. While its 501(c)(3) application was being approved by the Internal Revenue Service (IRS), the organization was fiscally sponsored by the Equality Federation Institute. This allowed the organization to immediately pursue grant funding. The organization received its official designation from the IRS on June 5, 2011.

Equality Hawaii Action Fund was founded August 13, 2010, as a 527 organization. It was formed in response to Governor of Hawaii Linda Lingle vetoing a 2010 civil unions bill; opponents of legal recognition of same-sex relationships had made public pledges to remove from office any legislators who supported civil unions; and Gubernatorial candidates Mufi Hannemann and Duke Aiona were promising to not only veto any future civil unions legislation, but put the issue on the ballot.

Equality Hawaii was a founding member and fiscal agent of Hawaii United for Marriage, a coalition of organizations that advocated for the Hawaii Marriage Equality Act, which was signed into law on November 13, 2013, by Governor Neil Abercrombie, and same-sex couples began marrying on December 2, 2013.

From 2013 to 2016, Equality Hawaii worked to pass key legislation to empower and protect Hawaii’s LGBTQ community, enabling transgender people to change the gender identity maker on official documents and preventing health insurers from discriminating against them. In 2016 Equality Hawaii formed a strategic alliance to share networks and resources with the Hawaii LGBT Legacy Foundation, an organization dedicated to unifying, facilitating and empowering Hawaii’s LGBTQ community. 

Equality Hawaii ceased operations in January 2017.

Structure 
Equality Hawaii is often used to describe three separate organizations:
 Equality Hawaii — a 501(c)(4) organization
 Equality Hawaii Foundation — a 501(c)(3) organization
 Equality Hawaii Action Fund — a 527 organization

Activities 
Equality Hawaii activities and programs included:
 Hawaii Family Portraits
 Community education
 Media relations
 Community outreach
 Legislative lobbying
 Voter outreach

See also 

 LGBT rights in Hawaii
 Same-sex marriage in Hawaii
 List of LGBT rights organizations

References

External links 
 

LGBT law in the United States
LGBT political advocacy groups in Hawaii
Organizations established in 2007
Organizations established in 2009
Organizations established in 2010
2007 establishments in Hawaii
2009 establishments in Hawaii
2010 establishments in Hawaii
Equality Federation
Organizations based in Honolulu
Charities based in Hawaii
501(c)(4) nonprofit organizations
527 organizations